William J. Smith (born in Baltimore, Maryland) was the manager and also played for the  Baltimore Marylands during their lone season in the National Association. The Marylands went 0–6 for the season and Smith's record was 0–5. As a player, he batted .174, and committed eight errors in six games while splitting time in the outfield, catcher, and second base. Later, on July 12, 1886, he credited as making an appearance as the umpire for a game between the Detroit Wolverines and the Kansas City Cowboys.

References

External links

19th-century baseball players
Major League Baseball outfielders
Major League Baseball catchers
Baseball player-managers
Baltimore Marylands players
Baseball players from Baltimore
Year of birth unknown
Year of death unknown